Now You're Gone – The Album is the third studio album by Swedish musician Basshunter. Released on 14 July 2008, it is his debut English language album, entering the UK Albums Chart at number one, and selling in excess of 329,717 copies in the UK making it platinum.

In New Zealand, the album peaked at number one in its fifth week, and was certified platinum and selling over 20,000 copies. The album spent a total of two weeks at number one.

Reception 

Ronny Larsson from QX noted that the English-language lyrics no longer refer to the data as they did on the LOL album, but still sings on about nonsense, adding that dance music lyrics are not too poetic.

Chart performance 
On 20 July 2008, Now You're Gone – The Album debuted at number one on the UK Albums Chart.

Track listing

Charts

Weekly charts

Year-end charts

Certifications

Release history

See also 
 List of UK Albums Chart number ones of the 2000s
 List of UK Dance Albums Chart number ones of 2008
 List of number-one albums from the 2000s (New Zealand)
 New Zealand top 50 albums of 2009

References

External links 
 

2008 albums
Basshunter albums
Ultra Records albums
Warner Music Sweden albums